Männer is a 1984 song by German singer Herbert Grönemeyer, released as the first single from the album 4630 Bochum.

The 'Männer' single release is still one of the most successful titles of Grönemeyer. The youth magazine Bravo described the song as "catchy male harassment". German magazine Der Spiegel described the song as "half satire, half eulogy, partly Men's Lib, partly Chauvi Restoration".

Track listing
7" Single EMI 14 6906 7	1984

. 	Männer	  	3:45
. 	Amerika		3:24

Charts

Cover versions
1989: Bläck Fööss
1993: Vicky Leandros (Antres)
1995: JBO (Frauen)
1996: Otto Waalkes (Hexen (Männer))
1999: Nina Hagen
2000: Manfred Krug
2014: TheBossi

References

1984 songs
Macaronic songs